Jefferson County Airpark (Steubenville, Ohio) , is a full-service general aviation public airport near Steubenville, Ohio, U.S., part of the Pittsburgh Combined Statistical Area that serves small and mid-sized private, corporate and commercial traffic.  The airport serves transients traveling to and from Eastern Ohio, the Northern Panhandle of West Virginia, and Western Pennsylvania (Pittsburgh). The airport founded in January 1948 by R. G. and Pauline Pier as Pier Airport.

History

Coal mine to Airfield (1940s - 1992)
Rene Pier purchased the land on which the Jefferson County Airpark is located in the early 1940s to conduct strip-mining operations. After mining operations were completed around 1950, the property owner constructed a slag-surfaced runway and erected two large hangars that were procured from military surplus stock. Through the 1950s and 1960s the government encouraged flying and the airport saw thriving times. During this era about 50 aircraft were based at what was then known as the Pier Airport.

In the early 1980s Mr. Dominic Teramana purchased the airport site and operated the facility for about five years. He sold the 385-acre tract of land to the board of commissioners of Jefferson County, Ohio, in 1985 for $225,000. In early 1992, a group of pilots realized Jefferson County lacked an essential asset of any progressive community – an adequate airport. The group also understood that an airport is a tool to be used by business and is an incentive for attracting new business. They believed if the airport was to survive they had to act. From these aviators grew the theory of an airport management board that would consist of skilled pilots and successful business people using sound business practices to build a successful airport.

Rebuilding an Airport (1992-1996)
On July 23, 1992, the Jefferson County Board of Commissioners adopted a resolution establishing an airport authority. The commissioners signing the document were William Crabbe, Albert Olexia and Edward Swiger. They named the following to serve as the charter members of the board of trustees of the Jefferson County Regional Airport Authority (JCRAA): Geary Bates, Phillip Bender, Ralph Freshwater, Gary Smith, and Terry Sterling. The board members served in a non-compensated capacity. Mr. Bender was selected to serve as the first Board president. Charles Edwards consented to serve as solicitor and David Hunt assumed the duties of clerk. Thus began the task of drafting a facilities management agreement, by-laws, rules and regulations, and setting goals.

The Jefferson County Commissioners had contracted, in 1988, with Richland Engineering Limited of Mansfield, Ohio to produce an airport master plan. It had been completed for years but was not used until the new board began the task assigned to it. Needs were prioritized and action commenced.

The board members, and others, worked hard to accomplish much with little. These non-compensated Trustees donated time, equipment, material, and energy to the gargantuan task facing them. A courtesy car was needed; a board member donated it. A riding mower was needed; a board member donated it. Two board members donated large tractors with brush hogs and operators. Several pilots volunteered their mowers and use of their snowplow equipped trucks for snow removal. Finally, the budget afforded the purchase of a snow blade. But, there was still no truck, so it was fitted on a large dump truck loaned by a board member. The airport used that loaned truck until December, 1998 when a used snow plow was purchased at auction from the Wheeling – Ohio County Airport.

While operations continued, the board members also concentrated on working with Richland Engineering Ltd. to implement the provisions of the airport improvement plan. Thanks to Mr. Dominic Teramana, the trustees were informed that coal lay beneath the proposed construction areas of the airport. The county commissioners approved the use of any money derived from coal sales for capital improvements. The removal and sale of the coal that lay beneath the runway extension area proved to be extremely beneficial. The proceeds enabled the board to purchase a tractor with a blade, a loader, and a mower.

Meanwhile, the trustees prioritized the necessary capital improvements, namely a fuel storage facility, terminal building, new hangars, and adequate parking. In early 1995 a contract was signed for the purchase of four hangar parks, at eight units each. Pilots using the field, along with others, committed to renting these hangars. The terminal building was the first building constructed. Money from coal sales, student labor from the Jefferson County Joint Vocational School, and volunteer labor, mostly from pilots, resulted in the successful completion of the terminal building at a cost less than $50,000.

Installation of utilities quickly followed the construction of the terminal building. Even though only electricity was needed for the four hangar buildings that would soon be constructed, water, sewer, and telephone services were also installed. Local businesses volunteered machinery, equipment, and labor and the board members loaned equipment and operators to complete the project. Backhoes and bulldozers worked weeks to dig hundreds of feet of ditching for these utilities.

The board not only had the burden of operations and reconstruction; they also oversaw the coal removal operations. This, in itself, presented numerous problems – licensing, product marketing, and sales fluctuations, to name just a few. Trustee Geary Bates assumed the responsibility of the coal operations, which reaped monetary rewards for the Airpark.

Volunteer labor, donated materials and equipment, and hours of hard work resulted in great savings. It is estimated that these factors saved the County in excess of $320,000.

On July 26, 1996, the board of trustees of the Jefferson County Regional Airport Authority dedicated its reconstructed airport in the presence of various federal, state, and local government officials and friends of the airport. The first phase of what is an ongoing effort to improve the airport and its facilities was brought to a close.

The renovated facility boasted a full-time airport management team, a 10,000-gallon above-ground fuel facility, parking, 32 T-hangars, a passenger terminal and lounge, flight school and flight training, pilot supplies, ground transportation, a public telephone, a pilots' lounge and snooze room, restrooms, and snack machines. In addition, the access road is paved, the existing runway is 3,500 feet by 60 feet (compared to the previous 3,200 feet by 32 feet runway), a new taxiway (which is three-quarters the length of the runway), new lighting systems for the runway and taxiway, a new ramp area, and grading and seeding of the entire surrounding area.

1996-Present
Mr. Eric Bates of Bates Bros. Amusements was the first business to realize the advantages of being located at the Airpark. Subsequently, Mr. Bates expanded his operation intro three additional businesses, namely A.R.M. U.S., American Superior Lighting, and Illumitec.

In August 1998 the board successfully petitioned the Jefferson County Commissioners to purchase, at a cost of $350,000, a 167-acre farm that was adjacent to the Airpark. It and the Airpark were only separated by County Road 33 at the 14 end of the runway. This land purchase permitted the expansion and improvement of the Airpark. This move allowed the authority to begin the second phase of the twenty-year airport improvement plan. The first step of this phase was the removal of a small hill and tree obstructions located on the newly purchased land. The second step was the relocation of County Road 33 to accommodate the extension of the runway. This extension increased the length of the runway to its current 4400 feet with room to grow to 5000 feet. This expansion was followed by the addition of a second 10,000-gallon above-ground fuel tank to allow the sale of jet fuel.

In June 2007 ground was broken for a new terminal building, with construction completed a year later. Located southeast from the old terminal across the apron, the new facility is situated roughly mid-field with a view from one end of the runway to the other. With nearly double the amount of available space, the new building allows the Airpark to increase the conveniences and amenities provided to pilots. The Airpark now has multiple bathrooms equipped with showers, a dedicated pilots' lounge/snooze room, a flight-planning room, and a larger conference room available for meetings or presentations.

In April 2008 STAT MedEvac, a division of the Center for Emergency Medicine of Western Pennsylvania, became based at the Airpark.

April 2009 saw the beginning of construction on a new 60 by 60-foot hangar for corporate aircraft. This new hangar is located near the location of the original hangars towards the southeast end of the airfield. On April 16, 2010, a windstorm damaged the old hangars. The roof of the smaller of the World War II surplus hangars was lifted off of its framework and dropped onto the larger of the two. The related damage sustained to the structures rendered the buildings unsound and they were condemned. Although they were the most visible links to the airport's history, they will be replaced with new hangars along with further renovations of the apron area at the southeast end of the field.

Future
The original investment of $225,000 grew to more than $3 million and at little cost to Jefferson County. The Airport Authority cooperates with the FAA, ODOT, and the state, county, and local government officials.

References

External links 

Airports in Ohio
Transportation in Jefferson County, Ohio
Buildings and structures in Jefferson County, Ohio